Svein Erik Brodal (born 21 February 1939 in Østre Toten, Oppland) is a Norwegian actor, theatre director, poet, novelist and politician. He made his stage debut at Det Norske Teatret in 1960, and served as theatre director from 1979 to 1990. He was a deputy representative to the Storting from 1997 to 2001.

External links

References

1939 births
Living people
People from Østre Toten
Labour Party (Norway) politicians
Norwegian male stage actors
Norwegian theatre directors
Norwegian male poets
20th-century Norwegian novelists
Norwegian male novelists